Đorđe Lazić (Serbian Cyrillic: Ђорђе Лазић; born 18 June 1983) is a Serbian professional footballer who plays as an attacking midfielder.

Club career
Lazić started out at his hometown club Budućnost Valjevo. He also played for Remont Čačak and Mladost Lučani, before joining Partizan in the 2007 winter transfer window. With the Crno-beli, Lazić won the double in the 2007–08 season.

In the winter of 2009, Lazić went abroad to Ukraine and signed with Metalurh Donetsk. He spent the following six and a half years there, before the club folded in July 2015. After being without a club for six months, Lazić joined fellow Ukrainian Premier League club Stal Dniprodzerzhynsk until the end of the season.

In the summer of 2016, Lazić moved to Greece and signed for Xanthi. He spent one year with the club, making 26 league appearances and scoring three goals.

In the 2018 winter transfer window, Lazić returned to his homeland Serbia and joined his former club Mladost Lučani.

International career
In November 2007, Lazić was called up to the Serbia national team by manager Javier Clemente for their rescheduled UEFA Euro 2008 qualifier at home against Kazakhstan, but failed to make his debut.

Statistics

Honours
Partizan
 Serbian SuperLiga: 2007–08
 Serbian Cup: 2007–08
Metalurh Donetsk
 Ukrainian Cup: Runner-up 2009–10, 2011–12
 Ukrainian Super Cup: Runner-up 2012

References

External links

 FPL profile
 
 

Association football midfielders
Expatriate footballers in Greece
Expatriate footballers in Ukraine
FC Metalurh Donetsk players
FC Stal Kamianske players
FK Budućnost Valjevo players
FK Mladost Lučani players
FK Partizan players
FK Remont Čačak players
Serbian expatriate footballers
Serbian expatriate sportspeople in Greece
Serbian expatriate sportspeople in Ukraine
Serbian footballers
Serbian SuperLiga players
Sportspeople from Valjevo
Super League Greece players
Ukrainian Premier League players
Xanthi F.C. players
1983 births
Living people